Georgie Harris (1898–1986) was a British film actor.

Selected filmography
 Don't Be a Dummy (1932)
 Doctor's Orders (1934)
 Radio Parade of 1935 (1934)
 The Stoker (1935)
 Strictly Illegal (1935)
 One Good Turn (1936)
 Captain Bill (1936)
 Boys Will Be Girls (1937)
 Rhythm Racketeer (1937)

References

External links

1898 births
1986 deaths
Male actors from Liverpool
English male film actors
20th-century English male actors